Fred Marhenke (born 19 April 1950) is a German judoka. He competed in the men's middleweight event at the 1976 Summer Olympics.

References

1950 births
Living people
People from Sömmerda
German male judoka
Sportspeople from Thuringia 
Olympic judoka of West Germany
Judoka at the 1976 Summer Olympics